In mathematics and theoretical physics, an invariant differential operator is a kind of mathematical map from some objects to an object of similar type.

The word invariant indicates that the operator contains some symmetry. This means that there is a group  with a group action on the functions (or other objects in question) and this action is preserved by the operator:

Usually, the action of the group has the meaning of a change of coordinates (change of observer) and the invariance means that the operator has the same expression in all admissible coordinates.

Invariance on homogeneous spaces
Let M = G/H be a homogeneous space for a Lie group G and a Lie subgroup H. Every representation  gives rise to a vector bundle

Sections  can be identified with

In this form the group G acts on sections via

Now let V and W be two vector bundles over M. Then a differential operator

that maps sections of V to sections of W is called invariant if

Invariance in terms of abstract indices

for some tensor .  Given an equivalence class of connections , we say that an operator is invariant if the form of the operator does not change when we change from one connection in the equivalence class to another. For example, if we consider the equivalence class of all torsion free connections, then the tensor Q is symmetric in its lower indices, i.e. . Therefore we can compute

where brackets denote skew symmetrization. This shows the invariance of the exterior derivative when acting on one forms.
Equivalence classes of connections arise naturally in differential geometry, for example:

 in conformal geometry an equivalence class of connections is given by the Levi Civita connections of all metrics in the conformal class;
  in projective geometry an equivalence class of connection is given by all connections that have the same geodesics;
 in CR geometry an equivalence class of connections is given by the Tanaka-Webster connections for each choice of pseudohermitian structure

Examples
 The usual gradient operator  acting on real valued functions on Euclidean space is invariant with respect to all Euclidean transformations.
 The differential acting on functions on a manifold with values in 1-forms (its expression is       in any local coordinates) is invariant with respect to all smooth transformations of the manifold (the action of the transformation on differential forms is just the pullback).
 More generally, the exterior derivative       that acts on n-forms of any smooth manifold M is invariant with respect to all smooth transformations. It can be shown that the exterior derivative is the only linear invariant differential operator between those bundles.
 The Dirac operator in physics is invariant with respect to the Poincaré group (if we choose the proper action of the Poincaré group on spinor valued functions. This is, however, a subtle question and if we want to make this mathematically rigorous, we should say that it is invariant with respect to a group which is a double cover of the Poincaré group)
 The conformal Killing equation       is a conformally invariant linear differential operator between vector fields and symmetric trace-free tensors.

Conformal invariance

Given a metric 

A classification of all linear conformally invariant differential operators on the sphere is known (Eastwood and Rice, 1987).

See also
Differential operators
Laplace invariant
Invariant factorization of LPDOs

Notes

References

Differential geometry
Differential operators